Giuseppe Mengoni (23 November 1829 – 30 December 1877) was an Italian architect. He designed the Galleria Vittorio Emanuele II in Milan. He also designed the Palazzo di Residenza of Bologna Saving Bank (Carisbo). He died by accident, falling off the roof of the gallery he had built.

References

Architects from Bologna
Architects from Milan
19th-century Italian architects
1829 births
1877 deaths
Accidental deaths from falls